Agua Blanca (Spanish: "White Water") may refer to several geographical locations:

In Mexico
Agua Blanca, Coahuila
Agua Blanca de Iturbide, Hidalgo
Agua Blanca, Oaxaca
Agua Blanca, Sonora

Other places
Agua Blanca (La Rioja), Argentina
Agua Blanca, Ecuador
Agua Blanca, Jutiapa, Guatemala
Agua Blanca District, El Dorado Province, San Martín Region, Peru
Agua Blanca (Ibiza), Spain
Agua Blanca, Portuguesa, municipality in Venezuela

See also
Whitewater (disambiguation)